Ch'aqra Punta (Quechua ch'aqra ford, punta peak; ridge; first, before, in front of, also spelled Chajrapunta) or Chakra Punta (Quechua chakra field) is a mountain in the Chunta mountain range in the Andes of Peru, about  high. It is situated in the Huancavelica Region, Castrovirreyna Province, Santa Ana District, and in the Huancavelica Province, Huacocolpa District. Ch'aqra Punta lies southwest of K'allapayuq and northeast of Wayra Q'asa.

References

Mountains of Huancavelica Region
Mountains of Peru